Tintin in Tibet is a video game based on the storyline of the same title from the series The Adventures of Tintin, the comics series by Belgian cartoonist Hergé. It was one of a series of two games released, the other being Prisoners of the Sun. It was released for the Super NES, Game Boy, Game Gear and the Mega Drive by the late 1995, followed by a version for PC (MS-DOS and Windows 95) in 1996 and Game Boy Color in 2001.

Release dates
 Tintin in Tibet for Mega Drive – 1995
 Tintin in Tibet for Game Boy – 1995
 Tintin in Tibet for Game Gear – 1995
 Tintin in Tibet for Super NES – December 1995
 Tintin in Tibet for PC – 1996
 Tintin in Tibet for Game Boy Color – 2001

Reception 
Mean Machines Sega gave the game a 70/100, praising the games visual looks, although stating "The actual gameplay, roving the left -right level from point to point, becomes repetitive". Total! gave the game a 79 out of 100, describing the game as being difficult and having "odd gameplay flaws", although also writing that the game "manages to display most of the traits of a good, solid platformer".

References

External links 
 Tintin Games at Tintinologist.org
 

1995 video games
Game Boy games
Master System games
Sega Genesis games
Super Nintendo Entertainment System games
Video games based on Tintin
Video games scored by Alberto Jose González
Video games developed in France
Windows games
Video games set in Tibet
Infogrames games
Single-player video games
Promethean Designs games